Davurkhon Karomatov (born 25 October 1998) is an Uzbekistani Paralympic judoka. He won the silver medal in the men's 81 kg event at the 2020 Summer Paralympics held in Tokyo, Japan.

References 

Living people
1998 births
Uzbekistani male judoka
Paralympic judoka of Uzbekistan
Paralympic silver medalists for Uzbekistan
Paralympic medalists in judo
Judoka at the 2020 Summer Paralympics
Medalists at the 2020 Summer Paralympics
Place of birth missing (living people)
21st-century Uzbekistani people